is the self-titled debut album by Japanese folk rock band Happy End. Because their third album is also self-titled, although written in English, this first album is also known by the name  after the sign depicted in the cover art.

Five bonus tracks were added when the album was included in the March 31, 2004 Happy End Box set.

Lyrics
All the album's lyrics were written by Takashi Matsumoto, with the exception of "Tobenai Sora" (Haruomi Hosono) and "Ira Ira" (Eiichi Ohtaki).

Michael K. Bourdaghs wrote that the first track "Haruyo Koi" ("Come, Spring!") is about "ordinary daily life in the city. Specifically, they take up the boredom of one who faces the New Year holiday alone, sitting by himself at his kotatsu after having abandoned his rural family home for a new life in the city."

Reception
There were highly publicized debates held between prominent figures in the Japanese rock industry, most notably the members of Happy End and Yuya Uchida, regarding whether rock music sung entirely in Japanese was sustainable. Previously, almost all popular rock music in Japan was sung in English. The success of Happy End's debut album, as well as their following album Kazemachi Roman, proved the sustainability of Japanese-language rock in Japan.

Julian Cope, English musician and author of Japrocksampler, referred to 1970's Happy End as clearly the band's best work. Both Cope and HMV Japan noted similarities to work by Crosby, Stills, Nash & Young.

Legacy
The song "Shin Shin Shin" inspired the 2013 film of the same name.

The album cover was featured in the first episode of the 2017 anime Tsuki ga Kirei.

In 2021, photographer Mike Nogami released the photobook Yudemen containing pictures he took of Happy End during the recording of the album and an interview with Shigeru Suzuki.

Track listing

Personnel
Haruomi Hosono - vocals, bass, keyboards, guitar
Eiichi Ohtaki - vocals, guitar, 12-string guitar
Shigeru Suzuki - lead guitar, celesta
Takashi Matsumoto - drums, percussion
Eiji Ogura - 12-string guitar, hand clapping

References 

1970 debut albums
Happy End (band) albums
Japanese-language albums